{{Infobox road
|country = IRL
|type = R
|route = 194
|image = R194_road_in_Virginia,_County_Cavan,_Ireland.jpg
|image_notes = R194 in Virginia
|length_km = 67
|destinations = 
 County Longford
 Longford - leave at roundabout junction with N4 and  N63
 Killoe
 Edgeworthstown
 Drumlish
 Ballinalee
 Granard - join/leave the N55; (R396)
 County Cavan
Join/leave the R394
  passes Lough Sheelin
Join/leave the R154
 Ballyjamesduff - (R196)
 (R195)
 Virginia joins the N3; (R178); leave the N3
 Mullagh - (R191)
 County Meath Moynalty - terminates at the'' R164
| previous_type = R
| previous_route = 193
| next_type = R
| next_route = 195
}}

The R194 road''' is a regional road in Ireland linking Longford in County Longford to Virginia in County Cavan to Moynalty in County Meath. 

See also
Roads in Ireland
National primary road
National secondary road

References
Roads Act 1993 (Classification of Regional Roads) Order 2006 – Department of Transport

Regional roads in the Republic of Ireland
Roads in County Cavan
Roads in County Longford
Roads in County Meath